Kenny Foster (born June 16, 1985) is an American mixed martial artist. A professional mixed martial artist since 2009, Foster has competed for Bellator, holding a record of 3–6 with the promotion.

Mixed martial arts career
Foster made his professional MMA debut in February 2009. He amassed a record of 7-2 before signing with Bellator Fighting Championships.

Bellator Fighting Championships
Foster made his Bellator debut on October 21, 2010, at Bellator 33 where he defeated Lester Caslow via unanimous decision.

In January 2011, Bellator announced that Foster will be a part of the Bellator Season 4 Featherweight Tournament and will face 4 time NCAA Division I All American wrestler, Eric Larkin. At Bellator 37, Foster won via guillotine choke in round 1 to move on to the semifinals.

At Bellator 41, he then faced Daniel Mason-Straus, who was on an 11 fight win streak before entering the fight. He lost the fight via guillotine choke in round 3.

Foster appeared on the Bellator 53 card against Englishmen, Ronnie Mann. The fight was billed as a qualifier fight for the sixth season featherweight tournament. Foster lost the fight in the first round via submission (triangle choke).

Foster took an off fight from Bellator when he competed for Cage Fury Fighting Championships on February 4, 2012. Foster fought undefeated prospect Joey Gambino in the main event for the featherweight championship. Foster lost the fight via unanimous decision.

Foster was scheduled to fight Bobby Reardanz on the undercard of Bellator 60 replacing Mike Corey after Corey was asked to replace an injured Wagnney Fabiano in the season six featherweight tournament. However, after weigh-in issues forced Genair da Silva out of the featherweight tournament, Foster was asked to take his place in the tournament and fight Alexandre Bezerra in the opening round. He lost via submission (rear naked choke) in the second round.

Foster then made a quick turnaround and faced Jay Haas at Bellator 65 on April 13, 2012. He won the fight via guillotine choke. He faced Claudio Ledesma at Bellator 74 on September 28, 2012. He lost the fight via unanimous decision.

After a short hiatus from MMA, Foster returned to Bellator and faced Anthony Morrison at Bellator 108 on November 15, 2013. He lost the fight via majority decision. Foster then faced Chris Piriz at Bellator 110 on February 28, 2014. He lost the fight via unanimous decision, dropping him to 3–7 in his last ten fights.

Other promotions
Foster faced Andy Main at CFFC 36: Secor vs. Good on June 21, 2014. He won the fight via split decision.

Foster faced Mike Santiago for the vacant ROC Featherweight Championship on January 23, 2015, at Ring of Combat 50. He lost the fight via guillotine choke submission in the first round.

Mixed martial arts record

|-
| Loss
|align=center|12–13
|Jacob Bohn
|Decision (split)
|CES NY 1
|
|align=center|3
|align=center|5:00
|Westbury, New York, United States
|
|-
| Loss
|align=center|12–12
|Tim Dooling
|Decision (split)
|Ring of Combat 60
|
|align=center|3
|align=center|4:00
|Atlantic City, New Jersey, United States
|
|-
|Win
|align=center|12–11
|Joe Pingitore
|Decision (unanimous)
|CES 42
|
|align=center|3
|align=center|5:00
|Lincoln, Rhode Island, United States
|
|-
| Loss
|align=center|11–11
|Calvin Kattar
|Decision (split)
|CES 34
|
|align=center|3
|align=center|5:00
|Atlantic City, New Jersey, United States
|
|-
| Loss
|align=center|11–11
|Lester Caslow
|Submission (guillotine choke)
|Ring of Combat 50
|
|align=center|3
|align=center|2:04
|Atlantic City, New Jersey, United States
|
|-
| Loss
|align=center|11–10
|Mike Santiago
|Submission (guillotine choke)
|Ring of Combat 50
|
|align=center|1
|align=center|1:33
|Atlantic City, New Jersey, United States
|
|-
|Win
|align=center|11–9
|Andy Main
|Decision (split)
|CFFC 36: Secor vs. Good
|
|align=center|3
|align=center|5:00
|Morristown, New Jersey, United States
|
|-
|Loss
|align=center|10–9
|Chris Piriz
|Decision (unanimous)
|Bellator 110
|
|align=center|3
|align=center|5:00
|Uncasville, Connecticut, United States
|
|-
|Loss
|align=center|10–8
|Anthony Morrison
|Decision (majority)
|Bellator 108
|
|align=center|3
|align=center|5:00
|Atlantic City, New Jersey, United States
|Catchweight (150 lb) bout.
|-
|Loss
|align=center|10–7
|Claudio Ledesma
|Decision (unanimous)
|Bellator 74
|
|align=center|3
|align=center|5:00
|Atlantic City, New Jersey, United States
|Bantamweight debut.
|-
|Win
|align=center|10–6
|Jay Haas
|Submission (guillotine choke)
|Bellator 65
|
|align=center|1
|align=center|2:51
|Atlantic City, New Jersey, United States
|
|-
|Loss
|align=center|9–6
|Alexandre Bezerra
|Submission (rear naked choke)
|Bellator 60
|
|align=center|2
|align=center|4:57
|Hammond, Indiana, United States
|
|-
|Loss
|align=center|9–5
|Joey Gambino
|Decision (unanimous)
|Cage Fury Fighting Championships 13
|
|align=center|5
|align=center|5:00
|Atlantic City, New Jersey, United States
|
|-
|Loss
|align=center|9–4
|Ronnie Mann
|Submission (triangle choke)
|Bellator 53
|
|align=center|1
|align=center|3:51
|Miami, Oklahoma, United States
|
|-
| Loss
|align=center|9–3
| Daniel Mason-Straus
| Submission (guillotine choke)
| Bellator 41  
| 
|align=center|3
|align=center|3:48
|Yuma, Arizona, United States
|Bellator Season 4 Featherweight Tournament Semifinal.
|-
| Win
|align=center|9–2
| Eric Larkin
| Submission (guillotine choke)
| Bellator 37  
| 
|align=center|1
|align=center|3:15
|Concho, Oklahoma, United States
|Bellator Season 4 Featherweight Tournament Quarterfinal.
|-
| Win
|align=center|8–2
| Lester Caslow
| Decision (unanimous)
| Bellator 33 
| 
|align=center|3
|align=center|5:00
|Philadelphia, Pennsylvania, United States
|
|-
| Loss
|align=center|7–2
| Donny Walker
| TKO (punches)
| EFC: Downtown Beatdown 3   
| 
|align=center|3
|align=center|0:52
|Erie, Pennsylvania, United States
|
|-
| Win
|align=center|7–1
| Marcos Rodrigues
| TKO (punches)
| UCC 1: Merciless   
| 
|align=center|1
|align=center|2:39
|Jersey City, New Jersey, United States
|
|-
| Win
|align=center|6–1
| Joel Roberts
| Decision (split)
| PFC: PA Fighting Championships 2   
| 
|align=center|3
|align=center|5:00
|Harrisburg, Pennsylvania, United States
|
|-
| Win
|align=center|5–1
| Doug Sonier
| Submission (arm-triangle choke)
| True Cage Warriors: Cage Wars 1   
| 
|align=center|1
|align=center|1:24
|Irving, New York, United States
|
|-
| Win
|align=center|4–1
| Chris Foster
| Submission (rear-naked choke)
| CFX: Wartown Beatdown 4    
| 
|align=center|1
|align=center|4:41
|Worcester, Massachusetts, United States
|Won the vacant NECF Featherweight Championship.
|-
| Win
|align=center|3–1
| Travis Lerchen
| Submission
| American Steel Cagefighting 2   
| 
|align=center|2
|align=center|N/A
|Salem, New Hampshire, United States
|
|-
| Win
|align=center|2–1
| Mervin Rodriguez
| Decision (unanimous)
| American Steel Cagefighting 1  
| 
|align=center|3
|align=center|3:00
|Salem, New Hampshire, United States
|
|-
| Loss
|align=center|1–1
| Mackens Semerzier
| Submission (triangle choke)
| Elite Fighting Challenge 4
| 
|align=center|1
|align=center|1:03
|Norfolk, Virginia, United States
|
|-
| Win
|align=center|1–0
| Mark Getto
| Decision (unanimous)
| WCA: Pure Combat 
| 
|align=center|3
|align=center|5:00
|Atlantic City, New Jersey, United States
|

References

External links

American wrestlers
Living people
American male mixed martial artists
People from New York (state)
Featherweight mixed martial artists
Mixed martial artists utilizing collegiate wrestling
1985 births